Albert Hammond Staton (December 4, 1899 – January 15, 1980) was a college football and basketball player for the Georgia Tech Yellow Jackets of the Georgia Institute of Technology, and a Coca Cola executive in Colombia.

Early years 
Albert Staton was born on December 4, 1899 in Attalla, Alabama, the son of John Curtis Staton and Bivien Hammond Staton. He attended Boys High School in Atlanta, Georgia.

Georgia Tech 
Staton graduated with a mechanical engineering degree from Georgia Tech. He was a prominent end for the Georgia Tech football team. He was selected All-Southern every year he played, and picked for its All-Era Team. Albert played with his brother John.  

In 1921, Staton was captain of the basketball team.

Staton was elected into the Georgia Tech Athletics Hall of Fame in 1963.

Al Staton was the first chief executive officer of the Alumni Association and editor of its magazine. He could also sing, a baritone.

Coca-Cola 
He worked for the Coca Cola company in Colombia, founding the company  Panamerican Beverages. He joined the company in 1924.

World War II
During World War II, he served in the Army Air Corps.

References

American football ends
American football tackles
All-Southern college football players
Georgia Tech Yellow Jackets football players
Georgia Tech Yellow Jackets men's basketball players
1899 births
1980 deaths
People from Etowah County, Alabama
Players of American football from Alabama
American men's basketball players
People from Medellín